Sebastopol or Sevastopol is a city on the Crimean peninsula.

Sebastopol may also refer to:

Places

Australia
 Sebastopol, New South Wales, a parish in Clarendon County, New South Wales
 Sebastopol, Waljeers, a parish in Waljeers County, New South Wales
 Sebastopol, an unincorporated parish in Yancowinna County, New South Wales
 Sebastopol, South Australia, a locality in Wattle Range Council
 Sebastopol, Victoria, a suburb of Ballarat

Canada
 Sebastopol, Ontario, a community in the township of Perth East, Perth County
 Sebastopol Township, Ontario, amalgamated into Bonnechere Valley township, Renfrew County

France
 Boulevard de Sébastopol, a street in Paris
 Théâtre Sébastopol, an opera house in Lille

United States
 Sebastopol, California, a city in Sonoma County
 Sebastopol, Nevada County, California, an unincorporated community 
 Sebastopol Plantation House, an a National Register of Historic Places listing in St. Bernard Parish, Louisiana
 Sebastopol, Michigan, a ghost town in Ottawa County
 Sebastopol, Mississippi, a town in Leake and Scott counties
 Sebastopol, a village in Jenkins Township, Luzerne County, Pennsylvania
 Sebastopol House Historic Site, an historic site in Seguin, Guadalupe County, Texas 
 Sebastopol, Texas, an unincorporated community in Trinity County

Other places
 Sebastopol, Torfaen, a suburb of Pontypool, Wales, United Kingdom
 Sébastopol, Mauritius, a place in Mauritius
 Sebastopol, a village in Meinerzhagen, Germany
 Sebastopol, in Dooniver, Achill Island, County Mayo, Ireland
 Sebastopol, a mountain in Aoraki/Mount Cook National Park, New Zealand

Music
 Sebastopol (band), an English alternative-rock band
 Sebastopol (album), a 2001 album by Jay Farrar

Other uses
 Sebastopol (mortar), a large 19th-century Ethiopian artillery mortar
 Sebastopol (ship), a clipper ship
 Sebastopol goose, a breed of goose
 Sebastopol, a domino game

See also
 Réaumur – Sébastopol (Paris Métro), a station of the Paris Métro
 Sebastopolis (disambiguation)
 Sevastopol (disambiguation)